Oscuros Rinocerontes Enjaulados is a 1990 short Cuban film.

Description
Using a broad range of experimental techniques, the film takes on some of the giants of absurdist and surreal filmmaking. Made by a graduate of the first generation of students from the film school at San Antonio de los Baños, Cuba, this black and white parody of bureaucracy in Cuba features a cleaning woman who discovers that her boss is making obscene phone calls. The film was directed by Juan Carlos Cremata, then a Cuban student at the EICTV (International Film School of San Antonio de los Baños). The short made the festival rounds winning several awards and is now considered a Latinamerican Classic.

Awards
 Gran Premio "El Chicuelo". IV Festival de Cine Joven, La Habana, Cuba
 Premio "Saúl Yelín" de la Federación Nacional de Cine Clubes de Cuba. 1990.
 Premio "Yara". Centro Cinematográfico. La Habana, 1990.
 Grand Prize EISENSTEIN at the Wilhelmshaven International Film Festival, Germany, 1992.
 Archived at Museum of Modern Art (MOMA), 1996.

External links
EICTV Spanish-language synopsis

1990 comedy films
1990 films
1990s Spanish-language films
Cuban comedy films
Cuban short films
Comedy short films